Sayed Tanveer Hashmi, also known as Tanveer Hashmi, is a Sufi leader and spiritual master From Bijapur Sharif, a Sufi shrine in Karnataka, India. Tanveer Hashmi is a patron of various academic, social, and other activities of Sufi Sunni Muslims in India. He belong to Hussiani Hashmi Family, the family of Ahle Bait. His official name in Shajra Shareef (Sufi Order) is Syed Mohiuddin Hussaini Hashmi Al-Qadri.

He was recently appointed as President of Jamat E Ahle Sunnat, Karnataka. He is also Founder President of Al Hashmi Educational Welfare & Charitable Trust, which is providing Islamic & Formal Education. He is The President of Muslim Muttahida Council (MMC), a consortium of Muslim organizations. He is also member of Muslim Personal Law Board.

Family 
He was born on 22 November 1972, in Sufi City of Bijapur, in highly religious Sufi family of Pir Hashim. Hashimpeer came to Bijapur, Karnataka, which was under the rule of Ibrahim Adil Shah II. Under his influence Ibrahim Adil Shah then gave up un-Islamic practices.

Qutbul Aqtab Hashimpeer (Died: 7 of Ramdhan 948 Hijari 1646 AD) came to Bijapur, Karnataka on specific instructions from the Prophet of Islam. He was brought up in a highly scholastic atmosphere under the influence of Sayedna Vajhuddin Hussaini Gujrati, popularly known as Haider Ali Sani. It was during the rule of Ibrahim Adil Shah-II when Hazrath Hashimpeer arrived in Bijapur and it was his influence on the Adil Shahi dynasty that transformed the dynasty which was following Un-Islamic and Heretic practices. Hashim Pir was born in 1576–77 in the family of a wealthy judge of Ahmedabad, Qazi Burhan al-Din.Hazrat Hashimpeer was brought up in an incredibly educational environment as this was an effect of Sayed Shah Wajihuddin Hussaini Gujarati, popularly known as Haider Ali Sani. This family belong to a prophetic lineage.

Activism 

Sayed Tanveer Hashmi, also the President of the Muslim Muttahida Council, Bijapur which has been working for various social causes.

In city of Belgaum, there was big issues of fake graves, which was sorted out by Team lead by Tanveer Hashmi.

He has been attending various seminars and conferences including international conferences.

Sayed Tanveer Hashmi organised a protest against cartoons of Muhammad.

References

External links 
 
President of Ahle Sunnah Wal Jamaat of Karnataka, India: Through Imam al-Sajjad, we differentiate between Islam and terrorism
Maulana Tanveer Hashmi appeals all Muslims to take Covid vaccine
Karnataka’s influential Mulana Sayed Tanveer Hashmi, spoke in Bijapur about the benefits of vaccination
Unanimous stand of Indian Muslim Organisations on Kashmir
SC to decide constitutional validity of revocation of Article 370: Muslim bodies
‘Indian Muslims are so patriotic that they will live and die in India but never think of going to Pakistan’

Indian Sufi religious leaders
Living people
Bijapur, Karnataka
1972 births
Social leaders